Schweitzer Glacier is a glacier which drains west along the north side of Littlewood Nunataks into Vahsel Bay. The Lerchenfeld Glacier, trending west-northwestward, coalesces with the lower portion of this glacier. Discovered by the German Antarctic Expedition, 1911–12, under Wilhelm Filchner. He named it for Major Schweitzer, first president of the German Antarctic Expedition Society.

See also
 List of glaciers in the Antarctic
 Glaciology

References
 
 

Glaciers of Coats Land